Toni Katić (born July 9, 1992) is a Croatian professional basketball player for  Dinamo București of the Romanian League.

Katić signed with Dinamo Sassari on November 7, 2020.

On August 19, 2021, he signed with Cluj-Napoca of the Romanian Liga Națională and FIBA Basketball Champions League. On September 29, he signed with JDA Dijon Basket of the LNB Pro A and the Basketball Champions League.

References

External links
 Toni Katić Basketball Player Profile on Eurobasket.com
 Toni Katić Basketball Player Profile on RealGM.com
 Toni Katić Basketball Player Profile on FIBA.com

1992 births
Living people
ABA League players
Croatian men's basketball players
HKK Široki players
JDA Dijon Basket players
KK Cedevita players
KK Cibona players
KK Split players
Sportspeople from Makarska
Point guards